The 2005 Clipsal 500 Adelaide was a motor race for V8 Supercars held on the weekend of 17 - 20 March 2005. The event was held at the Adelaide Street Circuit in Adelaide, South Australia, and consisted of two races of 250 kilometres in length. It was the first round of thirteen in the 2005 V8 Supercar Championship Series.

Results

Qualifying

Top Ten Shootout

Race 1

Race 2

References

Adelaide 500
Clipsal 500